Journo may refer to:

Elan Journo, an Israeli writer
JournoList, a Google Groups forum existing up to 2010
140journos, a news outlet covering news related to Turkey
Journalist, a person who collects, writes, or distributes news or other current information to the public.